The third and final season of the American streaming television series Jessica Jones, which is based on the Marvel Comics character of the same name, follows Jones as she teams up with her mother's killer Trish Walker to take down a highly intelligent psychopath until a devastating loss reveals conflicting ideals that pits them against each other. It is set in the Marvel Cinematic Universe (MCU), sharing continuity with the films and other television series of the franchise. The season is produced by Marvel Television in association with ABC Studios and Tall Girls Productions, with Melissa Rosenberg and Scott Reynolds serving as showrunners.

Krysten Ritter stars as Jones alongside Rachael Taylor as Walker, with Eka Darville and Carrie-Anne Moss also returning from previous seasons, as well as J. R. Ramirez, Mike Colter, and David Tennant in guest roles. They are joined by Benjamin Walker, Sarita Choudhury, Jeremy Bobb, and Tiffany Mack. The third season was ordered in April 2018, a month after the second season was released. Filming for the season began by the end of that June, with Ritter making her directorial debut during the season. 

The season was released on June 14, 2019, and consists of 13 episodes. Netflix canceled the series on February 18, 2019.

Episodes

Cast and characters

Main
 Krysten Ritter as Jessica Jones
 Rachael Taylor as Patricia "Trish" Walker
 Eka Darville as Malcolm Ducasse
 Benjamin Walker as Erik Gelden
Sarita Choudhury as Kith Lyonne
Jeremy Bobb as Gregory Salinger
 Tiffany Mack as Zaya Okonjo
 Carrie-Anne Moss as Jeri Hogarth

Recurring
 Rebecca De Mornay as Dorothy Walker
 Aneesh Sheth as Gillian
 Jessica Frances Dukes as Grace
 John Ventimiglia as Eddy Costa
 Rachel McKeon as Char
 Jamie Neumann as Brianna "Berry" Gelden

Notable guests
 J. R. Ramirez as Oscar Arocho
 Kevin Chacon as Vido Arocho
 Tijuana Ricks as Thembi Wallace
 Maury Ginsberg as Steven Benowitz
 Mike Colter as Luke Cage
 David Tennant as Kilgrave (voice)

Production

Development
On April 12, 2018, a month after the release of the second season, Netflix ordered a third season of Jessica Jones. The season consists of 13 episodes. Scott Reynolds joined Melissa Rosenberg as co-showrunner for the season.

Casting
With the season order came confirmation that the returning starring cast would include Krysten Ritter as Jessica Jones, Rachael Taylor as Patricia "Trish" Walker, Eka Darville as Malcolm Ducasse, and Carrie-Anne Moss as Jeri Hogarth. Rebecca De Mornay also returns as Dorothy Walker while Benjamin Walker, Jeremy Bobb, Sarita Choudhury, Tiffany Mack, Jessica Frances Dukes and Aneesh Sheth joined the cast.

Filming
By the end of May 2018, Ritter was undergoing training to prepare for the start of filming "very soon", which would officially begin by the end of June. Ritter also made her directorial debut during the season.

Music
A soundtrack album for the season was released by Hollywood Records and Marvel Music digitally on July 19, 2019, with Sean Callery returning as composer.

All music composed by Sean Callery.

Release
The third and final season of Jessica Jones was released on Netflix worldwide on June 14, 2019. The season, along with the additional Jessica Jones seasons and the other Marvel Netflix series, was removed from Netflix on March 1, 2022, due to Netflix's license for the series ending and Disney regaining the rights. The season became available on Disney+ in the United States, Canada, United Kingdom, Ireland, Australia, and New Zealand on March 16, ahead of its debut in Disney+'s other markets by the end of 2022.

Critical response
On review aggregator Rotten Tomatoes, the season has an approval rating of 73% with an average rating of 6.40/10, based on 40 reviews. The website's critical consensus states, "Even if it's not the most satisfying finale for an entire era of Marvel television, Jessica Jones' final chapter finishes strong by giving its complicated heroine the space to change—and Krysten Ritter one last chance to work her sarcastic magic." On Metacritic, it has a weighted average score of 64 out of 100, based on 6 critics, indicating "generally favorable reviews".

References

External links
 

2019 American television seasons
03